The Urmeniș is a left tributary of the river Trotuș in Romania. Its source is near Moinești, at the southern end of the Tarcău Mountains. It flows into the Trotuș in Comănești.

References

Rivers of Romania
Rivers of Bacău County